Turn to Stone is a compilation album by American doom metal band Pentagram, comprising songs from their first three albums (Relentless, Day of Reckoning and Be Forewarned). It was released by Peaceville Records in 2002.

Track listing
 "Petrified"-5:54 (Bobby Liebling/Joe Hasselvander) (from Be Forewarned)
 "Wartime"-5:22 (Victor Griffin) (from Day of Reckoning)
 "All Your Sins"-4:36 (Liebling/Griffin) (from Relentless)
 "Frustration"-3:36 (Liebling) (from Be Forewarned)
 "Burning Savior"-9:06 (Griffin/Liebling) (from Day of Reckoning)
 "Sinister"-4:31 (Griffin) (from Relentless)
 "Bride of Evil"-4:34 (Hasselvander) (from Be Forewarned)
 "When the Screams Come"-3:40 (Liebling) (from Day of Reckoning)
 "Relentless"-3:47 (Griffin) (from Relentless)
 "Vampyre Love"-3:41 (Griffin) (from Be Forewarned)
 "Evil Seed"-4:39 (Griffin) (from Day of Reckoning)
 "The Ghoul"-5:12 (Hasselvander/Liebling) (from Relentless)
 "Wolf's Blood"-4:26 (Griffin) (from Be Forewarned)
 "Madman"-4:12 (Liebling) (from Day of Reckoning)
 "20 Buck Spin"-4:18 (Liebling) (from Relentless)
 "Death Row"-4:11 (Griffin) (from Relentless)
 "Live Free & Burn"-3:09 (Griffin/Hasselvander) (from Be Forewarned)

Lineup
Bobby Liebling – vocals
Victor Griffin – guitar
Martin Swaney – bass
Joe Hasselvander – drums

References 

Pentagram (band) compilation albums
2002 compilation albums
Peaceville Records compilation albums